The Protocol on Blinding Laser Weapons, Protocol IV of the 1980 Convention on Certain Conventional Weapons, was issued by the United Nations on 13 October 1995. It came into force on 30 July 1998. As of the end of April 2018, the protocol had been agreed to by 109 nations.

History
The Convention on Certain Conventional Weapons and three annexed protocols were adopted on 10 October 1980 and opened for signature on 10 April 1981. In 1986, Sweden and Switzerland pushed for the Blinding Laser Protocol. During 1989–91, the International Committee of the Red Cross (ICRC) held four international meetings of experts on the topic and in 1993 published Blinding Weapons.

Protocol text

Article 1
It is prohibited to employ laser weapons specifically designed, as their sole combat function or as one of their combat functions, to cause permanent blindness to unenhanced vision, that is to the naked eye or to the eye with corrective eyesight devices. The High Contracting Parties shall not transfer such weapons to any State or non-State entity.

Article 2
In the employment of laser systems, the High Contracting Parties shall take all feasible precautions to avoid the incidence of permanent blindness to unenhanced vision. Such precautions shall include training of their armed forces and other practical measures.

Article 3
Blinding as an incidental or collateral effect of the legitimate military employment of laser systems, including laser systems used against optical equipment, is not covered by the prohibition of this Protocol.

Article 4
For the purpose of this protocol "permanent blindness" means irreversible and uncorrectable loss of vision which is seriously disabling with no prospect of recovery. Serious disability is equivalent to visual acuity of less than 20/200 Snellen measured using both eyes.

Historical significance
ICRC welcomed the ban on blinding lasers as "a significant breakthrough in international humanitarian law," adding:

This was also the first international agreement regulating use of lasers during war. (Use of lasers during peace had been previously mentioned in Article IV of the US-Soviet Union Prevention of Dangerous Military Activities Agreement of 1989.)

Limitations
The Protocol does not prohibit attacks against binoculars, periscopes, telescopes, and other optical equipment because it was unknown whether laser attacks on such devices could cause permanent blindness. Article 3 allows for attacks on electronic optical equipment, because damaging it would not cause human injury.

Ophthalmologist John Marshall argues that despite the Protocol's ban, countries continue to develop and use "rangefinders, target illuminators, and anti-sensor systems" that "are still effectively antipersonnel laser weapons" because these technologies have the potential to be employed against people in addition to their intended uses. The only way to prevent all possible eye injuries by combat lasers would be to ban such lasers, but the countries negotiating the Protocol saw this as neither feasible militarily nor even desirable from a humanitarian standpoint because target-marking and rangefinding lasers are important for keeping munitions on target and away from civilians.

References

External links
Text
Ratifications 

United Nations treaties
Non-lethal weapons
Energy weapons
International humanitarian law treaties
Military lasers
Treaties concluded in 1995
Treaties entered into force in 1998
Treaties of Albania
Treaties of Algeria
Treaties of Antigua and Barbuda
Treaties of Argentina
Treaties of Australia
Treaties of Austria
Treaties of Bahrain
Treaties of Bangladesh
Treaties of Belarus
Treaties of Belgium
Treaties of Bolivia
Treaties of Bosnia and Herzegovina
Treaties of Brazil
Treaties of Bulgaria
Treaties of Burkina Faso
Treaties of Cambodia
Treaties of Cameroon
Treaties of Canada
Treaties of Cape Verde
Treaties of Chile
Treaties of the People's Republic of China
Treaties of Costa Rica
Treaties of Colombia
Treaties of Croatia
Treaties of Cuba
Treaties of Cyprus
Treaties of the Czech Republic
Treaties of Denmark
Treaties of the Dominican Republic
Treaties of Ecuador
Treaties of El Salvador
Treaties of Estonia
Treaties of Finland
Treaties of France
Treaties of Gabon
Treaties of Georgia (country)
Treaties of Germany
Treaties of Greece
Treaties of Grenada
Treaties of Guatemala
Treaties of the Holy See
Treaties of Honduras
Treaties of Hungary
Treaties of Iceland
Treaties of India
Treaties of Iraq
Treaties of Ireland
Treaties of Israel
Treaties of Italy
Treaties of Jamaica
Treaties of Japan
Treaties of Kazakhstan
Treaties of Kuwait
Treaties of Latvia
Treaties of Lesotho
Treaties of Liberia
Treaties of Liechtenstein
Treaties of Lithuania
Treaties of Luxembourg
Treaties of Madagascar
Treaties of the Maldives
Treaties of Mali
Treaties of Malta
Treaties of Mauritius
Treaties of Mexico
Treaties of Mongolia
Treaties of Montenegro
Treaties of Morocco
Treaties of Nauru
Treaties of the Netherlands
Treaties of New Zealand
Treaties of Nicaragua
Treaties of Niger
Treaties of Norway
Treaties of Pakistan
Treaties of Panama
Treaties of Paraguay
Treaties of Peru
Treaties of the Philippines
Treaties of Poland
Treaties of Portugal
Treaties of Qatar
Treaties of Moldova
Treaties of Romania
Treaties of Russia
Treaties of Saudi Arabia
Treaties of Serbia and Montenegro
Treaties of Seychelles
Treaties of Sierra Leone
Treaties of Slovakia
Treaties of Slovenia
Treaties of South Africa
Treaties of Spain
Treaties of Sri Lanka
Treaties of Saint Vincent and the Grenadines
Treaties of Sweden
Treaties of Switzerland
Treaties of Tajikistan
Treaties of North Macedonia
Treaties of Tunisia
Treaties of Turkey
Treaties of Ukraine
Treaties of the United Kingdom
Treaties of the United States
Treaties of Uruguay
Treaties of Uzbekistan
Treaties of Guinea-Bissau
Treaties extended to Greenland
Treaties extended to the Faroe Islands
1995 in Austria
Convention on Certain Conventional Weapons
Treaties extended to the Caribbean Netherlands